The National Police Cadet Corps (NPCC) is one of the national uniformed group for youths between age 13 to 17 in Singapore. The organisation is supported by the Ministry of Education and the Ministry of Home Affairs. Established in 1959, it trains young boys and girls in the values of law enforcement and public safety.

Brief history 
Following Singapore's successful elections of 1959, the new government, among other policies, began to pressure the Singapore Police Force (SPF) to form a youth unit on the lines of the long serving military cadet organizations of the island. 

On 8 May that year, the NPCC was born with then Commissioner E Alan G Blades approving the formation of the first police cadet unit, this day is annually marked as NPCC Day. The first platoon of 30 cadets, based in Bartley Secondary School, proved to be a success for the young organization. 

In 1961, Parliament passed the Police Cadet Corps Ordinance, officially endorsing the Corps as a national organization dedicated to training the young in the values of security in their communities even at a young age, affiliated to the SPF. Two years later, the first female cadets were admitted into the organisation.

Since 1961, the NPCC (then named the NCC (Police) from 1969 to 1972 as part of the integration of all national youth cadet organizations) has grown with the nation from strength to strength. During the brief period of Singapore being a state of Malaysia, the then Police Cadet Corps was affiliated to the Royal Malaysia Police.

Ranks

As NPCC is affiliated with the Singapore Police Force (SPF), the ranks of NPCC are similar. NPCC ranks have the suffix 'NPCC' on it to distinguish their ranks from the SPF ranks.

Activities 
Training may be held once or twice a week, depending on the school unit. Cadets can attain proficiency badges after completing the courses.

They may also participate in Area level activities, such as area-based camps at Camp Resilience, or even international activities, such as at the overseas educational visits to Brunei or Hong Kong.

See also
 Singapore Police Force
 National service in Singapore

References

External links
National Police Cadet Corps Singapore

Lists of Singaporean people
Singapore Police Force
Youth organisations based in Singapore